A Glan–Thompson prism is a type of polarizing prism similar to the Nicol and Glan–Foucault prisms.

Design
A Glan–Thompson prism consists of two right-angled calcite prisms that are cemented together by their long faces. The optical axes of the calcite crystals are parallel and aligned perpendicular to the plane of reflection. Birefringence splits light entering the prism into two rays, experiencing different refractive indices; the p-polarized ordinary ray is totally internally reflected from the calcite–cement interface, leaving the s-polarized extraordinary ray to be transmitted. The prism can therefore be used as a polarizing beam splitter. 

Traditionally Canada balsam was used as the cement in assembling these prisms, but this has largely been replaced by synthetic polymers.

Characteristics
Compared to the similar Glan–Foucault prism, the Glan–Thompson has a wider acceptance angle, but a much lower limit of maximal irradiance (due to optical damage limitations of the cement layer).

See also
Glan–Taylor prism

References

Polarization (waves)
Prisms (optics)